Susan Hall (born 1943) is an American artist.  Hall was born in Point Reyes Station, California. She attended the California College of Arts and Crafts and the University of California, Berkeley. Her work is included in the collections of the Whitney Museum of American Art and the Brooklyn Museum.

References

1943 births
Living people
20th-century American women artists
20th-century American artists
21st-century American women artists
21st-century American artists